Ultimax may refer to:

 the Ultimax 100, a firearm
 the Commodore MAX Machine, a computer also known as the Ultimax
 Persona 4 Arena Ultimax, a video game
 a model of Vico pump
 a model of engine used by the Doble steam car
 a brand of sock formerly sold by the Wigwam Mills hosiery company
 The Ultimax Man, a novel by Keith Laumer
 an alias of the DC Comics villain "Brain"